Nishchay Luthra (born 9 March 1999) is an Indian figure skater. He has competed in men's singles and pairs. He has won four international medals for India and was a 9-time Indian national gold medalist.

Personal life 
Nishchay Luthra was born in New Delhi, India. Before focusing on figure skating, he played basketball, taekwondo and cricket. He has a younger sister. Nishchay finished high school at The Indian School in New Delhi.

Career 
Nishchay started as a roller skater at the age of 10. His mother had searched online for a skating coach and found Vasudev Tandi, who taught Nishchay the basic moves and helped him graduate to ice-skating.

In 2012, Nishchay attended the National India Ice Skating Camp and competed in singles and pairs event, winning in both and represented India in Asian junior championship and secured first place. He started practicing in iSkate – an indoor ice skating rink in Gurgaon. In the year 2013, Nishchay  placed third at the Asian figure skating championship held in Hong Kong and won 2 Silver medals at the National Ice Skating Championship in singles and pairs events.

Nishchay represented India at the World Development Trophy 2014 in Manila, Philippines and placed third in the novice category. In 2015, due to lack of training infrastructure, he moved to the United States for 6 months. Due to lack of money, he returned to India in December 2015. He won 2 gold medals in the National Indian Ice Skating Championship in 2016.

Nishchay aimed to represent India at the 2018 Winter Olympics in PyeongChang, South Korea, but was not able to qualify for the qualifying competition.

In 2018 Nishchay moved to Dallas, Texas to train as a pair skater with the skater Hilary Asher under the coaching of Darlene Cain, Peter Cain, and Daniil Barantsev. After some months of rigorous training, Asher and Luthra signed up to compete at the Junior Grand Prix and other competitions representing India.

At the beginning of the competitive season, 2017-18 Luthra broke his right knee in a practice session, which led him to withdraw from the upcoming competitions and made him fly back to his home country. he was diagnosed with a severe lateral meniscus tear on his right knee.

During the recovery period, he started his own skating academy LIFSA (Luthra international figure skating academy) which aimed to develop figure skating as a sport in India. He was the national coach of season 2017-18 and 2018-19 and has helped many aspiring skaters. Luthra's students have been placed both nationally and internationally.

Achievements 

International Participations – 
 Asian Junior Figure Skating Challenge 2012-13 – Hong Kong
 Asian Junior Figure Skating Challenge 2013-14 – Hong Kong
 ISU World Development Trophy 2014 – Manila, Philippines
 Labour Day Competition 2016 – Florida, USA
National Level Achievements –
 2011- 7th Ice Skating Nationals, Shimla, India - 1 Gold 
 2012- 8th Ice Skating Nationals, Shimla, India - 2 Gold 
 2013- 9th Ice Skating Nationals, Shimla, India - 2 Silver 
 2014- 10th Ice Skating, Shimla, India - 2 Gold 
 2015 - 11th Ice Skating Nationals, Gurgaon, India - 2 Gold
 2016 - 12 Ice Skating Nationals, Gulmarg, India - 2 Gold and 1 Silver

References

External links 
 Nishchay Luthra - 2014 Asian Open Figure Skating Trophy Junior Men Winners
 Nishchay Luthra - Stats on Ice

1999 births
Living people
People from New Delhi
Sportspeople from Delhi
Indian male single skaters
Indian male pair skaters